Willard Stevenson is an American former Negro league pitcher who played in the 1940s.

Stevenson played for the Homestead Grays in 1940 and again in 1943. In four recorded career appearances on the mound, he posted a 4.35 ERA over 20.2 innings.

References

External links
 and Seamheads

Year of birth missing
Place of birth missing
Homestead Grays players
Baseball pitchers